Edward "Ted" Langridge (22 October 1936 – 27 July 2016) was an Australian rules football player who played in the VFL between 1955 and 1962 for the Richmond Football Club, and in the SANFL between 1963 and 1965 for the Sturt Football Club.

Following his retirement as a player, Ted was a football commentator on Adelaide TV stations NWS 9 and ADS 7.

References

 Hogan P: The Tigers Of Old, Richmond FC, Melbourne 1996
Vale Ted Langridge

External links

1936 births
2016 deaths
Richmond Football Club players
Sturt Football Club players
Australian rules footballers from Victoria (Australia)